The 1996 Libertarian National Convention was held in at the Hyatt Regency-Capitol Hill Hotel in Washington, DC, during the first weekend in July. Harry Browne was chosen as the party's nominee for president in the 1996 election.

"Declare your Independence" was the theme of the convention.

Libertarians hold a national convention, every two years to vote on party bylaws, platform and resolutions and elect national party officers and a judicial committee. Every four years it nominates presidential and vice presidential candidates.

Background
Some non-binding primary contests were held in some state's, such as in Illinois.

Voting for presidential nomination

First ballot
Harry Browne was nominated on the first ballot, gathering a majority of the voting delegates and defeating Rick Tompkins, Irwin Schiff and Doug Ohmen.

Voting for vice presidential nomination
The convention voted to suspend the rules and allow a voice vote for the vice presidential nomination.  After an initial voice vote led to a roll-call vote, Jo Jorgensen easily prevailed against no opposition, with 36 votes going to None of the Above.

Voice vote

See also
 Libertarian National Convention
 Other parties' presidential nominating conventions of 1996:
 Democratic
 Republican
 Libertarian Party of Colorado
 U.S. presidential election, 1996

References

External links

Libertarian Party (United States) National Conventions
1996 United States presidential election
1996 in Washington, D.C.
Political conventions in Washington, D.C.
1996 conferences
Libertarian National Convention